In mathematicsspecifically, in the theory of stochastic processesDoob's martingale convergence theorems are a collection of results on the limits of supermartingales, named after the American mathematician Joseph L. Doob. Informally, the martingale convergence theorem typically refers to the result that any supermartingale satisfying a certain boundedness condition must converge. One may think of supermartingales as the random variable analogues of non-increasing sequences; from this perspective, the martingale convergence theorem is a random variable analogue of the monotone convergence theorem, which states that any bounded monotone sequence converges. There are symmetric results for submartingales, which are analogous to non-decreasing sequences.

Statement for discrete-time martingales

A common formulation of the martingale convergence theorem for discrete-time martingales is the following. Let  be a supermartingale. Suppose that the supermartingale is bounded in the sense that

Then the sequence converges almost surely to a random variable  with finite expectation.

There is a symmetric statement for submartingales with bounded expectation of the positive part. A supermartingale is a stochastic analogue of a non-increasing sequence, and the condition of the theorem is analogous to the condition in the monotone convergence theorem that the sequence be bounded from below. The condition that the martingale is bounded is essential; for example, an unbiased  random walk is a martingale but does not converge.

As intuition, there are two reasons why a sequence may fail to converge. It may go off to infinity, or it may oscillate. The boundedness condition prevents the former from happening. The latter is impossible by a "gambling" argument. Specifically, consider a stock market game in which at time , the stock has price . There is no strategy for buying and selling the stock over time, always holding a non-negative amount of stock, which has positive expected profit in this game. The reason is that at each time the expected change in stock price, given all past information, is at most zero (by definition of a supermartingale). But if the prices were to oscillate without converging, then there would be a strategy with positive expected profit: loosely, buy low and sell high. This argument can be made rigorous to prove the result.

Proof sketch

The proof is simplified by making the (stronger) assumption that the supermartingale is uniformly bounded; that is, there is a constant  such that  always holds. In the event that the sequence  does not converge, then  and  differ. If also the sequence is bounded, then there are some real numbers  and  such that  and the sequence crosses the interval  infinitely often. These periods where the sequence starts below  and later exceeds  are called "upcrossings".

Consider a stock market game in which at time , one may buy or sell shares of the stock at price . On the one hand, it can be shown from the definition of a supermartingale that for any  there is no strategy which maintains a non-negative amount of stock and has positive expected profit after playing this game for  steps. On the other hand, if the prices cross a fixed interval  very often, then the following strategy seems to do well: buy the stock when the price drops below , and sell it when the price exceeds . But any strategy has expected profit at most , so necessarily

By the monotone convergence theorem for expectations, this means that 

so the expected number of upcrossings in the whole sequence is finite. It follows that the infinite-crossing event for interval  occurs with probability . If for all  there are finitely many upcrossings of interval , then the limit inferior and limit superior of the sequence must agree, so the sequence must converge. This shows that the martingale converges with probability .

Failure of convergence in mean

Under the conditions of the martingale convergence theorem given above, it is not necessarily true that the supermartingale  converges in mean (i.e. that ). 

Then  is a stopping time with respect to the martingale , so  is also a martingale, referred to as a stopped martingale. In particular,  is a supermartingale which is bounded below, so by the martingale convergence theorem it converges pointwise almost surely to a random variable . But if  then , so  is almost surely zero.

This means that . Moreover, if  were to converge in mean to any random variable , then some subsequence converges to  almost surely. So by the above argument  almost surely, which contradicts convergence in mean.

Statements for the general case
In the following,  will be a filtered probability space where , and  will be a right-continuous supermartingale with respect to the filtration ;  in other words, for all ,

Doob's first martingale convergence theorem

For , let  and suppose that

Then the pointwise limit

exists and is finite for -almost all .

Doob's second martingale convergence theorem

It is important to note that the convergence in Doob's first martingale convergence theorem is pointwise, not uniform, and is unrelated to convergence in mean square, or indeed in any Lp space. In order to obtain convergence in L1 (i.e., convergence in mean), one requires uniform integrability of the random variables . By Chebyshev's inequality, convergence in L1 implies convergence in probability and convergence in distribution.

The following are equivalent:

  is uniformly integrable, i.e.

Doob's upcrossing inequality
The following result, called Doob's upcrossing inequality or, sometimes, Doob's upcrossing lemma, is used in proving Doob's martingale convergence theorems. A "gambling" argument shows that for uniformly bounded supermartingales, the number of upcrossings is bounded; the upcrossing lemma generalizes this argument to supermartingales with bounded expectation of their negative parts.

Let  be a natural number. Let  be a supermartingale with respect to a filtration . These are called upcrossings with respect to interval . Then
 

Applications

Convergence in Lp
Let  be a continuous martingale such that

The statement for discrete-time martingales is essentially identical, with the obvious difference that the continuity assumption is no longer necessary.

Lévy's zero–one law

Doob's martingale convergence theorems imply that conditional expectations also have a convergence property.

Then

This result is usually called Lévy's zero–one law or Levy's upwards theorem. In plain language, if we are learning gradually all the information that determines the outcome of an event, then we will become gradually certain what the outcome will be. This sounds almost like a tautology, but the result is still non-trivial. For instance, it easily implies Kolmogorov's zero–one law, since it says that for any tail event A, we must have  almost surely, hence .

Similarly we have the Levy's downwards theorem :

Then

See also
Backwards martingale convergence theorem

References

  (See Appendix C)

Probability theorems
Martingale theory